The Rurouni Kenshin anime is the adaptation of the manga series with the same name by Nobuhiro Watsuki. Situated during the early Meiji period in Japan, the story tells about a fictional assassin named Kenshin Himura, who becomes a wanderer to protect the people of Japan.

The anime, directed by Kazuhiro Furuhashi, began airing on Japan's Fuji TV on January 10, 1996 and ended on September 8, 1998. It was produced by Aniplex and Fuji TV, and was animated from episode 1 to 66 by Studio Gallop, whereas the episodes from 67 onwards were animated by Studio Deen. The final episode, episode 95, did not air in Japan, but was a bonus episode for the VHS and DVD releases. The TV series was later licensed in North America by Media Blasters, who split it up into "seasons", and released on DVD. It started airing in the US on Cartoon Network as a part of the Toonami block on March 17, 2003, but ended at the completion of the "Season 2" (episode 62). Episodes 63-95 did not air, but were included in the DVD release. The twenty-two English DVDs from the series were released from July 18, 2000 to September 24, 2002. Each of them contains four episodes except for the volume 22 which contains five episodes. The "seasons" were later released in three premium "Bento box" DVD boxes on November 18, 2003, March 30, 2004 and July 27, 2004. They were released again, but in new packaging as "economy box" sets on November 15, 2005, January 17, 2006 and February 14, 2006.

There were 95 episodes in the Rurouni Kenshins TV series, but there are also two original video animation (OVA) series which have respectively four and two episodes. The first of them, Rurouni Kenshin: Trust & Betrayal was released in 1999 in Japan and in 2003 was collected into a two-hour feature-length motion picture with new animated sequences and released in North America as a Director's Cut DVD. The second OVA is Rurouni Kenshin: Reflection, composed of two episodes that were originally released from December 19, 2001 to March 20, 2002 in Japan. It was later released in the United States by ADV Films in DVD on March 25, 2003, while a Director's Cut edition was later released. Both OVAs were eventually released on Blu-ray Disc by Aniplex of America in 2011.

A series of two theatrical movies, retelling the story of the second arc/season, Rurouni Kenshin: New Kyoto Arc, was announced in April 2011. Part 1 titled Rurouni Kenshin: Shin Kyoto-Hen Zenpen Homura no Ori ("Rurouni Kenshin: New Kyoto Arc Part I: Cage of Flames") premiered on December 17, 2011 and ran at Tokyo's Cinema Sunshine Ikebukuro theater and Osaka's Cine-Libre Umeda theater for one week only. It was released on DVD and Blu-ray on March 21, 2012.

Episodes
A note on the "Season" nomenclature:

The "seasons" that comprise the following list correspond to Media Blaster's release of the series in North America. In Japan, Rurouni Kenshin was aired year-round continuously with regular preemptions for sporting events and television specials taking place, and not split into standard seasonal cycles.

Season 1

Season 2

Season 3

Animated film

OVAs

Rurouni Kenshin: Trust & Betrayal

Rurouni Kenshin: Reflection

Rurouni Kenshin: New Kyoto Arc

References